Worawut Srisupha (born May 25, 1992), or formerly Worawut Kaewpook is a Thai professional footballer who plays as a goalkeeper for Thai League 1 club Port and the Thailand national team.

International career
In March, 2019 he was in the squad of Thailand for 2019 China Cup, but did not make an appearance.

On 12 April 2021, He was named in manager Akira Nishino’s 47-man squad for Thailand’s 2022 World Cup qualification

Honour
Port
 Thai FA Cup (1): 2019

External links
Worawut Srisupha profile at Port website
้

1984 births
Living people
Worawut Srisupha
Worawut Srisupha
Association football goalkeepers
Worawut Srisupha
Worawut Srisupha
Worawut Srisupha
Worawut Srisupha
Worawut Srisupha